Complejo Educacional de Chimbarongo is a Chilean high school located in Chimbarongo, Colchagua Province, Chile.

References 

Educational institutions established in 1982
Secondary schools in Chile
Schools in Colchagua Province
1982 establishments in Chile